The Baudó River  is a river of Colombia. It drains into the Pacific Ocean.

Fauna

Fish 
Andinoacara biseriatus - A Cichlid.

See also
 List of rivers of Colombia
 Pacific Region, Colombia

References

Rivers of Colombia